Craters of the Moon National Monument and Preserve is a U.S. national monument and national preserve in the Snake River Plain in central Idaho. It is along US 20 (concurrent with US 93 and US 26), between the small towns of Arco and Carey, at an average elevation of 5,900 feet (1,800 m) above sea level. 

The Monument was established on May 2, 1924. In November 2000, a presidential proclamation by President Clinton greatly expanded the Monument area. The 410,000-acre National Park Service portions of the expanded Monument were designated as Craters of the Moon National Preserve in August 2002. It spreads across Blaine, Butte, Lincoln, Minidoka, and Power counties. The area is managed cooperatively by the National Park Service and the Bureau of Land Management (BLM).

There are excellent examples of almost every variety of basaltic lava, as well as tree molds (cavities left by lava-incinerated trees), lava tubes (a type of cave), and many other volcanic features.

Geography and geologic setting 

Craters of the Moon is in south-central Idaho, midway between Boise and Yellowstone National Park. The lava field reaches southeastward from the Pioneer Mountains. Combined U.S. Highway 20–26–93 cuts through the northwestern part of the monument and provides access to it. However, the rugged landscape of the monument itself remains remote and undeveloped, with only one paved road across the northern end.

The Craters of the Moon Lava Field spreads across  and is the largest mostly Holocene-aged basaltic lava field in the contiguous United States. The Monument and Preserve contain more than 25 volcanic cones, including outstanding examples of spatter cones. The 60 distinct solidified lava flows that form the Craters of the Moon Lava Field range in age from 15,000 to just 2,000 years. The Kings Bowl and Wapi lava fields, both about 2,200 years old, are part of the National Preserve.

Together with fields from other fissures they make up the Lava Beds of Idaho, which in turn are in the much larger Snake River Plain volcanic province. The Great Rift extends across almost the entire Snake River Plain.

Most of this is lost in cracks in the basalt, only to emerge later in springs and seeps in the walls of the Snake River Canyon. Older lava fields on the plain have been invaded by drought-resistant plants such as sagebrush, while younger fields, such as Craters of the Moon, only have a seasonal and very sparse cover of vegetation. From a distance this cover disappears almost entirely, giving an impression of utter black desolation. Repeated lava flows over the last 15,000 years have raised the land surface enough to expose it to the prevailing southwesterly winds, which help to keep the area dry. Together these conditions make life on the lava field difficult.

Climate

History

Native American history 
Paleo-Indians visited the area about 12,000 years ago, but did not leave much in the way of archaeological evidence. The Northern Shoshone created trails through the Craters of the Moon Lava Field, during their summer migrations from the Snake River to the camas prairie (west of the lava field). Stone windbreaks at Indian Tunnel were used to protect campsites from the dry summer wind. No evidence exists for permanent habitation, by any Native American group. A hunter-gatherer culture, the Northern Shoshone subsisted off of the land’s bounty; in addition to gathering edible plants, nuts, roots, and berries, numerous game animals were hunted and trapped, both for meat and supplies, as well as for insulating skins and furs. Larger game hides were used in construction of shelters and windbreaks, while the more delicate furs of smaller mammals were often fashioned into many unisex articles of clothing, used to keep warm; smaller trapped and hunted species included animals such as squirrel, red fox, coyote, river otter, raccoon, pine marten, and rabbit, in addition to numerous bird species. For meat and larger hides, they pursued elk, mule deer, pronghorn, black bear, grizzly bear,  American bison, cougar, and bighorn sheep — large game, which no longer inhabit the immediate area; these species are still present outside of the national monument, and in other, further remote reaches of the state. At one time, woodland caribou ranged this far south, likely aiding in sustaining the Shoshone. The most recent volcanic eruptions ended about 2,100 years ago and were likely witnessed by the Shoshone people. Ella E. Clark has recorded a Shoshone legend which speaks of a serpent on a mountain who, angered by lightning, coiled around and squeezed the mountain until liquid rock flowed, fire shot from cracks, and the mountain exploded.

Goodale's Cutoff 

Pioneers traveling in wagon trains on the Oregon Trail in the 1850s and 1860s followed an alternative route in the area that used old Indian trails that skirted the lava flows. This alternative route was later named Goodale's Cutoff and part of it is in the northern part of the monument. The cutoff was created to reduce the possibility of ambush by Shoshone warriors along the Snake River such as the one that occurred at Massacre Rocks, which today is memorialized in Idaho's Massacre Rocks State Park.

After gold was discovered in the Salmon River area of Idaho, a group of immigrants persuaded an Illinois-born trapper and trader named Tim Goodale to lead them through the cutoff. A large wagon train left in July 1862 and met up with more wagons at Craters of the Moon Lava Field. Numbering 795 men and 300 women and children, the unusually large group was relatively unmolested during its journey and named the cutoff for their guide. Improvements to the cutoff such as adding a ferry to cross the Snake River made it into a popular alternative route of the Oregon Trail.

Exploration and early study 
In 1879, two Arco cattlemen named Arthur Ferris and J.W. Powell became the first known European-Americans to explore the lava fields. They were investigating its possible use for grazing and watering cattle but found the area to be unsuitable and left.

U.S. Army Captain and western explorer B.L.E. Bonneville visited the lava fields and other places in the West in the 19th century and wrote about his experiences in his diaries. Washington Irving later used Bonneville's diaries to write the Adventures of Captain Bonneville, saying this unnamed lava field is a place "where nothing meets the eye but a desolate and awful waste, where no grass grows nor water runs, and where nothing is to be seen but lava."

In 1901 and 1903, Israel Russell became the first geologist to study this area while surveying it for the United States Geological Survey (USGS). In 1910, Samuel Paisley continued Russell's work and later became the monument's first custodian. Others followed and in time much of the mystery surrounding this and the other Lava Beds of Idaho was lifted.

The few European settlers who visited the area in the 19th century created local legends that it looked like the surface of the Moon. Geologist Harold T. Stearns coined the name "Craters of the Moon" in 1923 while trying to convince the National Park Service to recommend protection of the area in a national monument.

Limbert's expedition 
Robert Limbert, a sometime taxidermist, tanner, and furrier from Boise, explored the area, which he described as "practically unknown and unexplored ..." in the 1920s after hearing stories from fur trappers about "strange things they had seen while ranging the region".

Limbert wrote:

Limbert set out on his third and most ambitious foray to the area in May 1920, this time with Walter Cole and an Airedale Terrier to accompany him. Starting from Minidoka, Idaho, they explored what is now the monument area from south to north passing Two Point Butte, Echo Crater, Big Craters, North Crater Flow, and out of the lava field through the Yellowstone Park and Lincoln Highway (now known as the Old Arco-Carey Road). Taking the dog along was a mistake, Limbert wrote, "for after three days' travel his feet were worn and bleeding."

A series of newspaper and magazine articles written by Limbert were later published about this and previous treks, which increased public awareness of the area. The most famous of these was an article that appeared in a 1924 issue of National Geographic where he called the area "Craters of the Moon," helping to solidify the use of that name. In the article he had this to say about the cobalt blue of the Blue Dragon Flows:

Protection and later history 

In large part due to Limbert's work, the 54,000-acre Craters of the Moon National Monument was proclaimed on May 2, 1924, by U.S. President Calvin Coolidge to "preserve the unusual and weird volcanic formations." The Craters Inn and several cabins were built in 1927 for the convenience of visitors. The Mission 66 Program initiated construction of today's road system, visitor center, shop, campground and comfort station in 1956, and in 1959 the Craters of the Moon Natural History Association was formed to assist the monument in educational activities.

Since then the monument has been enlarged. On October 23, 1970, Congress set aside a large part of it——as Craters of the Moon National Wilderness, protecting that part under the National Wilderness Preservation System.

From 1969 to 1972, NASA visited the real Moon through the Apollo program and found that its surface does not closely resemble this part of Idaho. NASA astronauts discovered that real Moon craters were almost all created by meteorites while their namesakes on Earth were created by volcanic eruptions. Apollo astronauts performed part of their training at Craters of the Moon Lava Field by learning to look for and collect good rock specimens in an unfamiliar and harsh environment.

For many years, geologists, biologists and environmentalists have advocated expansion of the monument and its transformation into a national park. The entire addition is called the Backcountry Area while the two older parts are called the Developed Area and Wilderness Area. Opposition by cattle interests and hunters to a simple expansion plan led to a compromise of having the National Park Service portion of the addition, which comprises the lava flows, become a national preserve in 2002 (which allows hunting, not ordinarily permitted in national parks and monuments in the U.S.). Craters of the Moon National Monument and Preserve is co-managed by the National Park Service and the Bureau of Land Management, both under the Department of the Interior; the BLM monument area is the non-lava grasslands. In March 2017, the Idaho Senate voted in favor of petitioning Congress to designate Craters of the Moon a national park.

Geology 

The Snake River Plain is a volcanic province that was created by a series of cataclysmic caldera-forming eruptions which started about 15 million years ago. A migrating hotspot thought to now exist under Yellowstone Caldera in Yellowstone National Park has been implicated. This hot spot was under the Craters of the Moon area some 10 to 11 million years ago but 'moved' as the North American Plate migrated northwestward. Pressure from the hot spot heaves the land surface up, creating fault-block mountains. After the hot spot passes the pressure is released and the land subsides.

Leftover heat from this hot spot was later liberated by Basin and Range-associated rifting and created the many overlapping lava flows that make up the Lava Beds of Idaho. The largest rift zone is the Great Rift; it is from this 'Great Rift fissure system' that Craters of the Moon, Kings Bowl, and Wapi lava fields were created. The Great Rift is a National Natural Landmark.

In spite of their fresh appearance, the oldest flows in the Craters of the Moon Lava Field are 15,000 years old and the youngest erupted about 2000 years ago, according to Mel Kuntz and other USGS geologists. Nevertheless, the volcanic fissures at Craters of the Moon are considered to be dormant, not extinct, and are expected to erupt again in less than a thousand years. There are eight major eruptive periods recognized in the Craters of the Moon Lava Field. Each period lasted about 1000 years or less and were separated by relatively quiet periods that lasted between 500 and as long as 3000 years.

Kings Bowl Lava Field erupted during a single fissure eruption on the southern part of the Great Rift about 2,250 years ago. This eruption probably lasted only a few hours to a few days. The field preserves explosion pits, lava lakes, squeeze-ups, basalt mounds, and an ash blanket. The Wapi Lava Field probably formed from a fissure eruption at the same time as the Kings Bowl eruption. More prolonged activity over a period of months to a few years led to the formation of low shield volcanoes in the Wapi field. The lava tube is remarkable for its length and for the number of well-preserved lava cave features, such as lava stalactites and curbs, the latter marking high stands of the flowing lava frozen on the lava tube walls. The lava tubes and pit craters of the monument are known for their unusual preservation of winter ice and snow into the hot summer months, due to shielding from the sun and the insulating properties of basalt.

As the eruption continues, pressure and heat decrease and the chemistry of the lava becomes slightly more silica rich. The curtain of lava responds by breaking apart into separate vents. Various types of volcanoes may form at these vents: gas-rich pulverized lava creates cinder cones (such as Inferno Cone – stop 4), and pasty lava blobs form spatter cones (such as Spatter Cones – stop 5). Later stages of an eruption push lava streams out through the side or base of cinder cones, which usually ends the life of the cinder cone (North Crater, Watchmen, and Sheep Trail Butte are notable exceptions). This will sometimes breach part of the cone and carry it away as large and craggy blocks of cinder (as seen at North Crater Flow – stop 2 – and Devils Orchard – stop 3). Solid crust forms over lava streams, and lava tubes (a type of cave) are created when lava vacates its course (examples can be seen at the Cave Area – stop 7).

Geologists feared that a large earthquake that shook Borah Peak, Idaho's tallest mountain, in 1983 would restart volcanic activity at Craters of the Moon, though this proved not to be the case. Geologists predict that the area will experience its next eruption some time in the next 900 years with the most likely period in the next 100 years.

Biology

Conditions 

All plants and animals that live in and around Craters of the Moon are under great environmental stress due to constant dry winds and heat-absorbing black lavas that tend to quickly sap water from living things. Summer soil temperatures often exceed  and plant cover is generally less than 5% on cinder cones and about 15% over the entire monument. Adaptation is therefore necessary for survival in this semi-arid harsh climate.

Water is usually only found deep inside holes at the bottom of blow-out craters. Animals therefore get the moisture they need directly from their food. The black soil on and around cinder cones does not hold moisture for long, making it difficult for plants to establish themselves. Soil particles first develop from direct rock decomposition by lichens and typically collect in crevices in lava flows. Successively more complex plants then colonize the microhabitat created by the increasingly productive soil.

The shaded north slopes of cinder cones provide more protection from direct sunlight and prevailing southwesterly winds and have a more persistent snow cover (an important water source in early spring). These parts of cinder cones are therefore colonized by plants first.

Gaps between lava flows were sometimes cut off from surrounding vegetation. These literal islands of habitat are called kīpukas, a Hawaiian name used for older land surrounded by younger lava. Carey Kīpuka is one such area in the southernmost part of the monument and is used as a benchmark to measure how plant cover has changed in less pristine parts of southern Idaho.

Plants 
There are 375 species of plants known to grow in the monument. When wildflowers are not in bloom, most of the vegetation is found in semi-hidden pockets and consists of pine trees, cedars, junipers, and sagebrush. Strategies used by plants to cope with the adverse conditions include:

 Drought tolerance by physiological adaptations such as the ability to survive extreme dehydration or the ability to extract water from very dry soil. Sagebrush and antelope bitterbrush are examples.
 Drought avoidance by having small, hairy, or succulent leaves to minimize moisture loss or otherwise conserve water. Hairs on scorpionweed, the succulent parts of the pricklypear cactus, and the small leaves of the wirelettuce are all local examples.

 Drought escape by growing in small crevices or near persistent water supplies, or by staying dormant for about 95% of the year. Mosses and ferns in the area grow near constant water sources such as natural potholes and seeps from ice caves. Scabland penstemon, fernleaf fleabane, and gland cinquefoil grow in shallow crevices. Syringa, bush rockspirea, tansybush, and even limber pine grow in large crevices. While dwarf monkeyflowers (photo) carry out their entire life cycle during the short wet part of the year and survive in seed form the rest of the time.

The root system monopolizes soil moisture in its immediate area, resulting in individual plants that are evenly spaced. Consequently, many visitors have asked park rangers if the buckwheat were systematically planted.

Wildflowers bloom from early May to late September but most are gone by late August. Moisture from snow-melt along with some rainfall in late spring kick-starts the germination of annual plants, including wildflowers. Most of these plants complete their entire life cycle in the few months each year that moisture levels are good. The onset of summer decreases the number of wildflowers and by autumn only the tiny yellow flowers of sagebrush and rabbitbrush remain. Some wildflowers that grow in the area are the arrow-leaved balsamroot, bitterroot, blazingstar, desert parsley, dwarf monkeyflower, paintbrush, scorpionweed, scabland penstemon and the wild onion.

Animals 
Years of cataloging by biologists and park rangers have recorded 2000 species of insects, 8 reptiles, 169 birds, 48 mammals, and even one amphibian (the western toad). Birds and some rodents are seen most frequently in the Craters of the Moon area. Brown bears once roamed this area but have long ago become locally extinct. Traditional livestock grazing continues within the grass/shrublands administered by the BLM.

Most desert animals are nocturnal, or mainly active at night. Nocturnal behavior is an adaptation to both predation and hot summer daytime temperatures. Nocturnal animals at Craters of the Moon include woodrats (also called packrats), skunks, foxes, bobcats, mountain lions, bats, nighthawks, owls, and most other small desert rodents.

Animals that are most active at dawn and dusk, when temperatures are cooler than mid-day, are called crepuscular. The subdued morning and evening light helps make them less visible to predators, but is bright enough to allow them to locate food. Some animals are crepuscular mainly because their prey is. Crepuscular animals in the area include mule deer, coyotes, porcupines, mountain cottontails, jackrabbits, and many songbirds.

Some desert animals are diurnal, or primarily active during the day. These include ground squirrels, marmots, chipmunks, lizards, snakes, hawks, and eagles.

Many animals have a specific temperature range where they are active, meaning the times they are active vary with the seasons. Snakes and lizards hibernate during the winter months, are diurnal during the late spring and early fall, and become crepuscular during the heat of summer. Many insects and some birds also alter their times of activity. Some animals, like ground squirrels and marmots, have one or more periods of estivation, a summer hibernation that allows them to avoid the hottest and driest periods.

Several animals are unique to Craters of the Moon and the surrounding area. Subspecies of Great Basin pocket mouse, American pika, yellow-pine chipmunk, and yellow-bellied marmot are found nowhere else. Lava tube beetles and many other cave animals are found only in the lava tubes of eastern Idaho.

Mule deer 
In May 1980 wildlife researcher Brad Griffith of the University of Idaho started a three-year study to mark and count the mule deer in the monument. The National Park Service was concerned that the local herd might grow so large that it would damage its habitat. Griffith found that this group of mule deer has developed a drought evasion strategy unique for its species.

The deer arrive in the southern part of the pre-2000 extent of the monument mid-April each year once winter snows have melted away enough to allow for foraging. Griffith found that by late summer plants in the area have already matured and dried to the point that they can no longer provide enough moisture to sustain the deer. Rain in late September prompts the herd to return to the monument to feed on bitterbrush until snow in November triggers them to migrate back to their winter range. This herd, therefore, has a dual summer range. It is also very productive with one of the highest fawn survival rates of any herd in the species.

Afternoon winds usually die down in the evening, prompting behavioral modifications in the herd. The deer avoid the dry wind by being more active at night when the wind is not blowing. In 1991 there was a three-year average of 420 mule deer.

Recreational activities 

Wildflowers, shrubs, trees, and wild animals can be seen by hiking on one of the many trails in the monument or by just pulling over into one of the turn-offs. More rugged hiking opportunities are available in the Craters of the Moon Wilderness Area and Backcountry Area, the roadless southern and major part of the monument.

 The Visitor Center is near the monument's only entrance. Various displays and publications along with a short film about the geology of the area help to orient visitors. Ranger-led walks are available in summer and cover topics such as wildlife, flowers, plants, or geology. Self-guiding tours and displays are available year-round and are easily accessible from the Loop Drive.
 A paved trail less than 1/4 mile (400 m) long at North Crater Flow (photo) crosses the North Crater Lava Flow, which formed about 2200 years ago, making it one of the youngest lava flows on the Craters of the Moon Lava Field. This lava is named for the purplish-blue tint that tiny pieces of obsidian (volcanic glass) on its surface exhibit. Good examples of pahoehoe (ropey), aa (jagged), and some block lava are readily visible along with large rafted crater wall fragments. The rafted crater wall fragments seen on the flow were once part of this cinder cone but were torn away when the volcano's lava-filled crater was breached. A 1.8-mile-long trail (2.9 km) includes the 1/2 mile (800 m) overlook trail but continues on through the crater and to the Big Craters/Spatter Cones parking lot.
 Devils Orchard (photo) is a group of lava-transported cinder cone fragments (also called monoliths or cinder crags) that stand in cinders. Like the blocks at stop 2 they were once part of the North Crater cinder cone but broke off during an eruption of lava. A 1/2 mile-long (800 m) paved loop trial through the formations and trees of the "orchard" is available. The interpretive displays on the trail emphasize human impacts to the area.
 Inferno Cone Viewpoint (photo) is on top of Inferno Cone cinder cone. A short but steep trail up the cinder cone leads to an overlook of the entire monument. From there the Spatter Cones can be seen just to the south along with a large part of the Great Rift. In the distance is the over 700-foot-tall (>200 m) Big Cinder Butte, one of the world's largest, purely basaltic, cinder cones. Further away are the Pioneer Mountains (behind the Visitor Center) and beyond the monument are the White Knob Mountains, the Lost River Range, and the Lemhi Range.
 Big Craters and Spatter Cones (photo) sit directly along the local part of the Great Rift fissure. Spatter cones are created by accumulations of pasty gas-poor lava as they erupt from a vent. Big Craters is a cinder cone complex less than  up a steep foot trail.
 Tree Molds (photo) is an area within the Craters of the Moon Wilderness where lava flows overran part of a forest. The trees were incinerated but as some of them burned they released enough water to cool the lava to form a cast. Some of these casts survived the eruption and mark the exact location and shape of the burning trees in the lava. Both holes and horizontal molds were left, some still showing shapes indicative of bark. The actual Tree Molds area is a mile (1.6 km) from the Tree Molds parking lot and picnic area off a moderately difficult wilderness trail. The Wilderness trail also leaves from this parking lot, and extends nearly  into the wilderness area before gradually disappearing near The Sentinel cinder cone. The  Broken Top loop trail encircles the youngest cinder cone in the monument and can be done separately or as part of a longer trek on the Wilderness trail. A pull off on the spur road leading to the Tree Molds area presents the Lava Cascades, a frozen river of Blue Dragon Flow lava that temporarily pooled in the Big Sink.
 Cave Area is the final stop on Loop Drive and, as the name indicates, has a collection of lava tube caves. Formed from the Blue Dragon Flow, the caves are a half-mile (800 m) from the parking lot and include,
 Dewdrop Cave,
 Boy Scout Cave,
 Beauty Cave, and
 Indian Tunnel.
 The caves are open to visitors but flashlights are needed except in Indian Tunnel and some form of head protection is highly recommended when exploring any of the caves. Lava tubes are created when the sides and surface of a lava flow hardens. If the fluid interior flows away a cave is left behind. Entering caves requires a free permit.

Craters of the Moon Campground has 51 sites – none of which can be reserved in advance. Camping facilities are basic but do include water, restrooms, charcoal grills, and trash containers. National Park Service rangers present evening programs at the campground amphitheater in the summer. Camping enables visitors to enjoy the park during the evening and morning, when the heat, glare and wind are far less.

A Lunar Ranger program enables children to earn an embroidered patch in a few hours.

Backcountry hiking is available in the Craters of the Moon Wilderness and the much larger Backcountry Area beyond (added in 2000). Only two trails enter the wilderness area and even those stop after a few miles or kilometers. From there most hikers follow the Great Rift and explore its series of seldom-visited volcanic features. All overnight backcountry hikes require registration with a ranger. No drinking water is available in the backcountry and the dry climate quickly dehydrates hikers. Avoiding summer heat and winter cold are therefore recommended by rangers. Pets, camp fires, and all mechanized vehicles, including bicycles, are not allowed in the wilderness area.

Skiing is allowed on the Loop Drive after it is closed to traffic in late November because of snow drifts. Cross-country skiing off Loop Drive is allowed but may be dangerous owing to sharp lava and hidden holes under the snow. Blizzards and other inclement weather may occur.

See also
 List of national monuments of the United States

Notes

References

Bibliography 

 
 
 
 
 
  (public domain text)

External links 

 Official websites: 
 National Park Service: Craters of the Moon National Monument 
BLM: Craters of the Moon National Preserve
 Presidential Proclamation 7373 (William Jefferson Clinton) – Boundary Enlargement of the Craters of the Moon National Monument — (also used as a reference)
  NPS: Geology of Craters of the Moon — (also used as a reference)
 NPS: Craters of the Moon − Historic Context Statements 
 Earthscope.org: Interpreting the Geologic Story of Craters of the Moon
 A Trip to the Moon  Documentary produced by Idaho Public Television
 An entry by the International Dark-Sky Association

National Park Service National Monuments in Idaho
National Preserves of the United States
Bureau of Land Management National Monuments
Bureau of Land Management areas in Idaho
Volcanism of Idaho
Caves of Idaho
Lava tubes
Rift volcanoes
Rock formations of Idaho
Volcanoes of Idaho
Yellowstone hotspot
Polygenetic volcanic fields
Quaternary Idaho
National Natural Landmarks in Idaho
Religious places of the indigenous peoples of North America
Landforms of Blaine County, Idaho
Landforms of Butte County, Idaho
Landforms of Lincoln County, Idaho
Landforms of Minidoka County, Idaho
Landforms of Power County, Idaho
1924 establishments in Idaho
Protected areas established in 1924
Protected areas of Blaine County, Idaho
Protected areas of Butte County, Idaho
Protected areas of Lincoln County, Idaho
Protected areas of Minidoka County, Idaho
Protected areas of Power County, Idaho
Tourist attractions in Blaine County, Idaho
Tourist attractions in Butte County, Idaho
Tourist attractions in Lincoln County, Idaho
Tourist attractions in Minidoka County, Idaho
Tourist attractions in Power County, Idaho
Units of the National Landscape Conservation System
Lava fields